is a railway station located in Hakubaicho, Takatsuki, Osaka Prefecture, Japan. It serves the JR Kyoto Line (Tōkaidō Main Line) of West Japan Railway Company. The distances to major stations are 21.2 km to Osaka Station, 21.6 km to Kyoto Station and 535.7 km to Tokyo Station. Takatsuki Station is one of the transportation hubs in the city of Takatsuki.

Trains 
All trains of the regional service of the JR Kyoto Line, i.e., Special Rapid Service, Rapid Service and local trains, stop at the station. Express and limited express trains, such as Super Hakuto and Kuroshio, do not make a stop at Takatsuki.

Some Special Rapid Service trains that stop at this station also stop at another Takatsuki Station in Takatsuki, Shiga Prefecture.

History 
Takatsuki station opened when the railway between Osaka and Kyoto started provisional operation between Osaka Station and Mukōmachi Station on 28 July 1876. Since the railway was first built with single track, the location of Takatsuki Station in the middle of Osaka and Kyoto was suitable for trains of both directions to cross each other.

Station numbering was introduced to the station in March 2018 with Takatsuki being assigned station number JR-A38.

Station facilities 
Takatsuki Station has two island platforms that enable passengers to transfer easily between local and rapid trains. It has separate tracks for passing trains as well. Stairs, escalators and elevators connect the two platforms to the upper level concourse. The station provides automated and window services for passengers including seat reservation.

By the bus terminals attached thereto, the station is connected with many locations in Takatsuki, as well as Hirakatashi Station on the Keihan Main Line in Hirakata, Osaka, across the Yodo River.

Environs 
There is an extensive shopping district between Takatsuki Station and Takatsuki-shi Station (Hankyu Kyoto Line). There are also department stores, Seibu and Matsuzakaya, around the station.

Adjacent stations

References 

Railway stations in Osaka Prefecture
Tōkaidō Main Line
Railway stations in Japan opened in 1876